Love Guaranteed may refer to:

 "Love Guaranteed" (song), by Damage
 Love Guaranteed (TV series), a Hong Kong television series
 Love, Guaranteed, a 2020 American romantic comedy film